John Edward Griffiths (10 April 1876 – 24 September 1953) was an English professional footballer who played as a wing half.

References

1876 births
1953 deaths
Footballers from Birmingham, West Midlands
English footballers
Association football wing halves
Soho Villa F.C. players
Halesowen Town F.C. players
Aston Villa F.C. players
Grimsby Town F.C. players
Northampton Town F.C. players
Hastings & St Leonards United F.C. players
English Football League players